Ella Kenion (born 18 June  1969) is an English comedy actress, known for shows such as The Catherine Tate Show, Five's sketch shows We Know Where You Live and Swinging, and in BBC Four's Fear of Fanny. However she is best known for her portrayal of Mrs. Cakeworthy in The Green Green Grass between 2005-2009.  

She played the role of Julie in the ITV series Hardware. She is currently appearing in television commercials for The AA. She also appeared in the BBC children's television series Swashbuckle as Captain Sinker. She is a former newsreader for talkSPORT talk radio station.

Filmography

Other appearances 
in murder mystery drama Rosemary and Thyme episode Enter Two Gardeners (6 August 2007)
in rural medical drama Doc Martin S02E03 'Blood Is Thicker', as a mother of a boy with suspected ADHD (24 November 2005)
in an episode of Genie in the House.
in the TV 90-minute feature Witness Against Hitler.
in Benidorm S01E06 (finale) as a con woman who scammed the Garvey family out of 20 euros.
in an episode of Holby City as midwife Paradise.
in an episode of Doctor Who "Let's Kill Hitler", where she played Harriet.
guest-starring an episode of Big Finish's Doctor Who Wrath of the Iceni, by John Dorney, where she played Boudica, Celtic Queen of Britain with Tom Baker.
in the sky living comedy series Gates as Mia
Captain Sinker in the CBeebies show Swashbuckle
Imelda Cakeworthy in the BBC Only Fools and Horses spin-off The Green Green Grass
as Laura Collins in the "New Tricks episode called 'Prodigal Sons' (1 September 2015)
as Celeste Palmerston in the Midsomer Murders episode called 'Death of the Small Coppers' (2018)
as Delilah (voice) in 101 Dalmatian Street.

References

External links

Ella Kenion at Sue Terry Voices

1969 births
Living people
Actresses from London
English television actresses